The 35th International Emmy Awards took place on November 19, 2007, at the New York Hilton Midtown in New York City and hosted by American actor Roger Bart. The award ceremony, presented by the International Academy of Television Arts and Sciences (IATAS), honors all programming produced and originally aired outside the United States.

The International Academy presented the International Emmys in eleven program categories as well as two special Awards. The Founders Award was presented by Robert De Niro to former U.S. Vice-President Al Gore for his role in launching cable/satellite channel Current TV and his ongoing effort to alert the world to one of the great challenges of our time, global warming. The Directorate Award was presented by actress, Carole Bouquet to Patrick Le Lay, Chairman and CEO of France’s TF1 Group for guiding the growth of the TF1 brand from a traditional commercial television broadcaster to a multi-media organization that is a pioneer in many of the emerging new digital platforms.

Ceremony 
The International Emmy nominees were announced by the International Academy of Television Arts and Sciences (IATAS) on October 7, 2007, at a press conference at MIPCOM in Cannes, France. A total of 16 countries were nominated for the awards, with the UK topping the list with eight nominations, followed by Brazil with seven. This is the first time ever that Colombia was nominated. The competition took place with three rounds of judging over a period of 6 months, with participation from over 500 judges in 35 countries.

The Oscar winner, Jim Broadbent, shared the best actor award with the Dutch Pierre Bokma. Muriel Robin won the award for best actress for Marie Besnard - The Poisoner, and Simon Schama's Power of Art: Bernini took the prize for arts programming. The best comedy and drama categories were also won by British programs. Poland won its first International Emmy in the Children & Young People category. Brazil, the second country with the largest number of award nominations, left the ceremony without a Win.

Presenters 
The following individuals, listed in order of appearance, presented awards.

Winners

Most major nominations 
By country
 — 8
 — 7

By network
BBC — 6
Rede Globo — 5

Most major awards 
By country
 — 7

By network
BBC — 6

References

External links 
 
 35TH INTERNATIONAL EMMY® AWARDS NOMINEES
 INTERNATIONAL EMMY AWARD WINNERS ANNOUNCED

International Emmy Awards ceremonies
2007 television awards
2007 in American television